DeSmog, (formerly The DeSmogBlog) founded in January 2006, is a journalistic and activist website that focuses on topics related to climate change. The site was founded, originally in blog format, by James Hoggan, president of a public relations firm based in Vancouver, British Columbia, Canada. 

DeSmog states that its primary function is to investigate and report on what it what it sees as misinformation campaigns and organizations opposing climate science and action. DeSmog is a partner in the Covering Climate Now project which organizes and assist news organizations cover climate change worldwide. DeSmog also maintains several databases of persons and organizations engaged in misinformation and lobbying against addressing climate change.

Content

Mission and audience
The blog was co-founded in January 2006 by James Hoggan, president of the public relations firm Hoggan and Associates.  In a February 2007 interview with the Vancouver Sun, Hoggan conveys his anger at industry interests who he believes mislead the public about the scientific understanding of global warming. He referred to this alleged misrepresentation of the facts as, "public relations at its sleaziest".  Hoggan used his public relations skills to start a blog that would "clear the PR pollution that clouds the science of climate change" and expose organizations and individuals which he considered to be unethical. DeSmog says it reports on the credibility of experts who appear to misrepresent the science of global warming in the media by investigating their scientific background, funding sources, and industry interests. The site originally targeted a Canadian audience but is now involved in global climate change coverage.

Contributors to the site assist in researching organizations that the site's staff believe are phony grassroots organizations, or astroturf groups, sponsored directly or indirectly by industries seeking to thwart climate change-related legislation. Organizations alleged by the blog to be astroturfs include Friends of Science, Natural Resources Stewardship Project, Global Climate Coalition, and International Climate Science Coalition.  Individuals that the site has identified as pushing an anti-climate change point of view are listed in the site's "Denial Database", with accompanying information about their industry affiliations and professional biographies.  In a Financial Post column, Canadian environmentalist Lawrence Solomon stated that the organization was, in Solomon's words, "specifically created for the purpose of discrediting skeptics".

In a 2007 report in The Globe and Mail, Hoggan stated that the most frequent visitors to the site came from Calgary, Ottawa, and Washington D.C.

Notable issues or media mentions
In one instance, the site responded to a 2006 open letter opposing the Canadian Government's climate-change plans, claimed to be signed by "accredited experts in climate and related scientific disciplines", by analyzing the list of the signatories. The site concluded that those checked had few peer-reviewed publications on the topic and/or had fossil-fuel industry connections.

DeSmog has criticized Financial Post editor and columnist Terence Corcoran, claiming he impedes progress on climate change and environmental protection legislation in Canada.  In turn, Corcoran has criticized Hoggan and his website, accusing both of serving the interests of large corporations hoping to make money on emissions trading.

The blog has been referenced in The Guardian by George Monbiot, who most recently cited a study by the website showing that in 2008 "the number of internet pages proposing that man-made global warming is a hoax or a lie more than doubled". In another column, Monbiot noted that DeSmog posted a video critical of Anthony Watts's blog Watts Up With That that Watts had deleted from YouTube for copyright reasons. Monbiot has also mentioned DeSmog's efforts to expose efforts by oil, coal, and electricity companies to manipulate media views on climate change.

Heartland Institute documents
In February 2012, DeSmog posted a number of internal documents purportedly from The Heartland Institute, a libertarian think tank. According to a statement posted on the Heartland Institute website, "Some of these documents were stolen from Heartland, at least one is a fake, and some may have been altered ... the authenticity of those documents has not been confirmed."

Days after the document posting, blogger and journalist Megan McArdle wrote on The Atlantic website of a comment to a blog post that suggested that one of the documents, a memo titled "2012 Heartland Climate Strategy", was likely a fake based on the document being a scan which included metadata with a US west coast time zone. DeSmog responded that they had "no evidence supporting Heartland's claim that the Strategic document is fake" and then included a number of references to McArdle's first piece on the topic.  McArdle then said of the DeSmog response that "The first two links are to my post, and they are an egregious misrepresentation of what I said", and goes on to note that "the stubborn willingness to ignore obvious problems becomes the story."

On February 20, 2012, Peter Gleick issued a statement in the Huffington Post explaining that he had received an anonymous document in the mail that seemed to contain details on the climate program strategy of the Heartland Institute. He admitted to soliciting and receiving additional material from the Institute "under someone else's name", calling his actions "a serious lapse of my own and professional judgment and ethics".

Founder and staff
The site's co-founder, James Hoggan, is president of the Vancouver-based public relations firm James Hoggan & Associates, chair of the David Suzuki Foundation, a trustee of the Dalai Lama Center for Peace and Education, and an executive member of the Urban Development Institute. He is the author (with Richard Littlemore) of the 2009 book Climate Cover-Up: The Crusade to Deny Global Warming, which criticizes global warming denial and conspiracy theories.  The sources do not identify the site's other co-founder.

The website names John Lefebvre as a benefactor.

Frequent early writers for the blog included Ross Gelbspan and Richard Littlemore, a science writer formerly of the  Vancouver Sun. The site's project manager was Kevin Grandia, who left to become the Director of Online Strategy at Greenpeace.  the site lists a staff of eleven, with executive director Brendan DeMelle.

Awards
The site was recognized in December 2007 by three British Columbia chapters of the Canadian Public Relations Society, the Vancouver, Victoria (CPRS-vi) and Northern Lights in Prince George, with an award for demonstrating "The highest ethical and professional standards while performing outstanding work". In a CPRS press release which accompanied the award, Hoggan stated that the site had been viewed by 520,000 people over its history, had been cited as a source by 24 media outlets, and mentioned in more than 4,500 other blogs. According to the press release, the blog was selected for the award by a panel of journalists and public relations professionals in Victoria, Vancouver, and Prince George.

DeSmog was also listed by Time magazine as one of the "best blogs of 2011" in June 2011.

See also
 Climate change denial
 Global warming controversy
 RealClimate
 Skeptical Science
 Watts Up With That

References

External links

Canadian political websites
Environmental blogs
Internet properties established in 2006